Bright is the debut album from Bright. It was recorded at The Space in Poughkeepsie, NY and released via the Ba Da Bing! imprint.

Track listing
All tracks by Bright except where noted.

"Canal" – 4:08
"The Res" – 3:08
"Enthusiasm" – 4:08
"Off" – 2:23
"Merrimac" – 2:02
"Point" – 2:44
"Lake Killala" – 3:32
"Elting 1901" – 3:27
"Switch" – 5:08
"Mugged" – 3:33
"Redefine" – 2:51
"All the Wheels Go" – 3:57
"Pannonica" – 3:04
"Perennials" (Adams, Bright) – 5:25
"Bohm and Pribram" – 1:45

Personnel 
 Bright – piano
 Jacques Cohen – engineer, mastering

References

1996 debut albums
Bright (American band) albums
Ba Da Bing Records albums